Manoel Messias Dos Santos Junior (born 19 November 1996) is a Brazilian triathlete. In 2019, he won the silver medal in the men's triathlon at the 2019 Pan American Games. He also won the gold medal in the mixed relay event together with Luisa Baptista, Vittória Lopes and Kaue Willy.

In 2021, he competed in the men's triathlon at the 2020 Summer Olympics held in Tokyo, Japan.

References

External links 
 

Living people
1996 births
Sportspeople from Fortaleza
Brazilian male triathletes
Pan American Games medalists in triathlon
Pan American Games gold medalists for Brazil
Pan American Games silver medalists for Brazil
Triathletes at the 2019 Pan American Games
Medalists at the 2019 Pan American Games
Triathletes at the 2020 Summer Olympics
Olympic triathletes of Brazil
Competitors at the 2018 South American Games
Competitors at the 2022 South American Games
South American Games gold medalists for Brazil
South American Games silver medalists for Brazil
South American Games medalists in triathlon
20th-century Brazilian people
21st-century Brazilian people